Rayella is a genus of parasitic alveolates belonging to the phylum Apicomplexia. Its vertebrate hosts are flying squirrels. The vectors are not presently known.

Taxonomy
This genus was described by Dasgupta in 1967.

Hosts
R. gigantica — spotted giant flying squirrel (Petaurista elegans caniceps)
R. hylopetei — particoloured flying squirrel (Hylopetes alboniger)
R. rayi — Himalayan flying squirrel (Petaurista magnificus)

Distribution
All of the currently known species have been reported from Darjiling, India.

References

Apicomplexa genera
Parasites of rodents
Haemosporida